Selma Hassan is the Minister of Labor and Human Welfare of Eritrea.

Prior to her appointment as Minister, Selma was Administrator of the Anseba Region.

See also
Politics of Eritrea

References

Anseba Region
Year of birth missing (living people)
Living people
People's Front for Democracy and Justice politicians
Government ministers of Eritrea
Women government ministers of Eritrea